Gary or Garry Wood is the name of:

Gary Wood (1942–1994), American football player
Gary Wood (filmmaker), independent filmmaker
Garry Wood (born 1988), Scottish footballer